Varsit (Kaitag and Dargwa: ВарситӀ) is a rural locality (a selo) and the administrative centre of Varsitsky Selsoviet, Kaytagsky District, Republic of Dagestan, Russia. The population was 245 as of 2010. There are two streets.

Geography 
Varsit is located 24 km south of Madzhalis (the district's administrative centre) by road. Surkhavkent and Shuragat are the nearest rural localities.

Nationalities 
Dargins live there.

References 

Rural localities in Kaytagsky District